Cucullanus elegans is a species of parasitic nematode. It is an endoparasite of the European perch (Perca fluviatilis).

Cucullanus elegans Zschokke, 1884, C. elegans Sramek, 1901, C. elegans Levander, 1926 and C. elegans Ruszkowski, 1926 are synonyms for Camallanus lacustris.

References 

 Über Furchung und Gastrulation bei "Cucullanus elegans" (Zed.), Inaugural-Dissertation von Erich Martini, E Martini - 1903
 Exhibition of the larval stage of Trichostrongylus pergracilis and a speci-men of Cyclops containing a living embryo of Cucullanus elegans. RT Leiper - Proc. Zool. Soc. London, 1910
 Sur un appareil moteur des valves buccales des cucullans. E Perrier - 1871

Ascaridida
Parasitic nematodes of fish
Perch
Invertebrates of Europe
Nematodes described in 1800
Endoparasites